This was a new event in the ITF Women's Circuit.

American-duo Shelby Rogers and Coco Vandeweghe won the title, defeating the top seeds Jocelyn Rae and Anna Smith in the final, 7–5, 7–6(7–1).

Seeds

Draw

References 
 Draw

Aegon Eastbourne Trophy - Doubles
Aegon Eastbourne Trophy